Nicolas Mathieu (born 2 June 1978, in Épinal) is a French author and winner of the Prix Goncourt in 2018.

Biography

His first novel is Aux animaux la guerre ("To Animals War"; 2014), a mystery and crime novel. It was adapted to a 6-part France 3 television series in 2018. It was translated into English in 2021 under the title (“Of Fangs And Talons”).

His second novel, Leurs enfants après eux (2018) is about a group of young people in a fictional rural northeastern French town over the course of six years. The novel portrays the problems caused by deindustrialization. It has been translated by William Rodarmor and was published in the United States as And Their Children After Them on 7 April 2020 by Other Press.

Awards and honours
2014 Prix Erckmann-Chatrian winner Aux animaux la guerre
2015 Prix Mystère de la critique winner Aux animaux la guerre
2015  prize for novel Aux animaux la guerre
2018 Prix Goncourt winner Leurs enfants après eux
2021 Albertine Prize winner for And Their Children After Them

Bibliography 
 Aux animaux la guerre, Actes Sud, 2014, 
 Translated by Sam Taylor as Of Fangs and Talons
 Paris/Colmar, Le Monde/SNCF, 2015, 
 Leurs enfants après eux, Actes Sud, 2018, 
 Translated by William Rodarmor as And Their Children After Them
 Rose Royal, Actes Sud, 2019, 
 Translated by Sam Taylor as Rose Royal:  A Love Story Connemara'', Actes Sud, 2022,

References

External links 
 Nicolas Mathieu et les gueules cassées de la France périphérique on Marianne
 Aux animaux la guerre, Nicolas Mathieu on La cause littéraire
 Nicolas Mathieu :Aux animaux la guerre on Le Concierge masqué
 Prix Erckmann-Chatrian 2014 à Nicolas Mathieu on Lorraine 3

1978 births
Living people
People from Épinal
21st-century French male writers
French crime fiction writers
Prix Goncourt winners